Cruel, Crazy Beautiful World may refer to:

 Cruel, Crazy Beautiful World, a 1989 studio album by Savuka
 Cruel Crazy Beautiful World, a 2011 novel by Troy Blacklaws